Capannoli is a comune (municipality) in the Province of Pisa in the Italian region Tuscany, located about  southwest of Florence and about  southeast of Pisa.

Capannoli borders the following municipalities: Casciana Terme Lari, Palaia, Peccioli, Ponsacco, Pontedera, Terricciola. The town of Santo Pietro Belvedere is included in the municipality of Capannoli.

References

External links

 Official website

Cities and towns in Tuscany